The 2017 Skate Canada International was the second event of the 2017–18 ISU Grand Prix of Figure Skating, a senior-level international invitational competition series, held at the Brandt Centre in Regina, Saskatchewan from October 27–29. Medals were awarded in the disciplines of men's singles, ladies' singles, pair skating, and ice dance. Skaters earned points toward qualifying for the 2017–18 Grand Prix Final.

Records 

The following new ISU best scores were set during this competition:

Entries
The ISU published the preliminary assignments on May 26, 2017.

Changes to preliminary assignments

Results

Men

Ladies

Pairs

Ice dance

References

Citations

External links 
http://www.isuresults.com/results/season1718/gpcan2017/

Skate Canada International
Skate Canada International
Skate Canada International
Skate Canada International